Netherlands men's national goalball team is the men's national team of Netherlands.  Goalball is a team sport designed specifically for athletes with a vision impairment.  The team takes part in international competitions.

Paralympic Games  
 

At the 1980 Summer Paralympics in Arnhem, Netherlands, twelve teams took part.  The team finished third. New York hosted the 1984 Summer Paralympics where thirteen teams participated and the team finished ninth.

World Championships  

IBSA World Goalball Championships have been held every four years from 1978.  The men's team had represents the country in these championships in 1982, 1986, 1990, and 1994.

Regional championships 

The team has competed in the IBSA Europe goalball region.  Groups A and C are held one year, and Group B the following year.  Strong teams move towards Group A.

References

Goalball men's
National men's goalball teams
Netherlands at the Paralympics
Goalball in the Netherlands
European national goalball teams